In the geologic time scale, the Northgrippian is the middle one of three ages or stages of the Holocene Epoch or Series. It was officially ratified by the International Commission on Stratigraphy in June 2018 along with the earlier Greenlandian and later Meghalayan ages/stages. The age takes its name from the North Greenland Ice Core Project (NorthGRIP). The age began 8,276 BP (6326 BCE or 3854 HE), near the 8.2-kiloyear event, and goes up to the start of the Meghalayan, which began 4,200 BP (2250 BCE or 7750 HE), near the 4.2-kiloyear event.

See also 
 Geologic time scale
 North Greenland Ice Core Project
 5th millennium BC

References 

7th millennium BC
01
Geological epochs

03